The Average Savage is the second album from Canadian First Nations hip hop duo, Snotty Nose Rez Kids. It was released independently in 2017 and served as a follow-up to their self-titled debut. The album was a critical success, propelling the duo into the national spotlight. The album was shortlisted for the 2018 Polaris Music Prize, and nominated for the Juno Award for Indigenous Music Album of the Year at the Juno Awards of 2019. In 2018, the album received a nomination for Best Rap/Hip Hop Album at the Indigenous Music Awards.

Track listing

References 

Snotty Nose Rez Kids albums
2017 albums